Nicholas Spicer was the member of Parliament for the constituency of Dover for the parliament of January 1397 and 1410.

References 

Members of the Parliament of England for Dover
Year of birth unknown
Year of death unknown
English MPs January 1397
English MPs 1410